Yava may refer to:

 Yava, Arizona, a populated place situated in Yavapai County
 Yava, Tajikistan, a town in north-western Tajikistan
 "Yava!", a song by Babymetal on the 2016 album Metal Resistance